Synagelides is a genus of Asian jumping spiders that was first described by W. Bösenberg & Embrik Strand in 1906. This genus and Agorius (and perhaps Pseudosynagelides) are separated as a genus group, sometimes called subfamily Agoriinae, but more recently downranked to tribe Agoriini of the Salticoida clade in subfamily Salticinae.

Species
 it contains sixty-six species, found only in Asia:

Synagelides agoriformis Strand, 1906 (type) – Russia (Far East), China, Korea, Japan
Synagelides angustus Li, Wang & Peng, 2021 – China
Synagelides annae Bohdanowicz, 1979 – China, Japan
Synagelides bagmaticus Logunov & Hereward, 2006 – Nepal
Synagelides birmanicus Bohdanowicz, 1987 – Myanmar
Synagelides bohdanowiczi Wang, Mi, Irfan & Peng, 2020 – China
Synagelides brahmaputra Caleb, Chatterjee, Tyagi, Kundu & Kumar, 2018 – India
Synagelides cavaleriei (Schenkel, 1963) – China
Synagelides darjeelingus Logunov & Hereward, 2006 – India
Synagelides doisuthep Logunov & Hereward, 2006 – Thailand
Synagelides emangou Liu, 2022 – China
Synagelides forkiforma Yang, Zhu & Song, 2007 – China
Synagelides gambosus Xie & Yin, 1990 – China
Synagelides gosainkundicus Bohdanowicz, 1987 – Nepal
Synagelides hamatus Zhu, Zhang, Zhang & Chen, 2005 – China
Synagelides haoyai Logunov, 2017 – Thailand
Synagelides hortonensis Kanesharatnam & Benjamin, 2020 – Sri Lanka
Synagelides huangsangensis Peng, Yin, Yan & Kim, 1998 – China
Synagelides hubeiensis Peng & Li, 2008 – China
Synagelides jinding Liu, 2022 – China
Synagelides jinggangshanensis Liu, Chen, Xu & Peng, 2017 – China
Synagelides jingzhao Yang, Zhu & Song, 2007 – China
Synagelides kochang Logunov, 2017 – Thailand
Synagelides kosi Logunov & Hereward, 2006 – Nepal
Synagelides kualaensis Logunov & Hereward, 2006 – Malaysia
Synagelides lakmalii Kanesharatnam & Benjamin, 2020 – Sri Lanka
Synagelides larisae Logunov, 2017 – Indonesia (Sumatra)
Synagelides latus Li, Wang & Peng, 2021 – China
Synagelides lehtineni Logunov & Hereward, 2006 – India
Synagelides leigongensis Wang, Mi, Irfan & Peng, 2020 – China
Synagelides logunovi Wang, Mi, Irfan & Peng, 2020 – China
Synagelides longus Song & Chai, 1992 – China
Synagelides lushanensis Xie & Yin, 1990 – China
Synagelides martensi Bohdanowicz, 1987 – India, Nepal
Synagelides munnar Logunov, 2017 – India
Synagelides nepalensis Bohdanowicz, 1987 – Nepal
Synagelides nishikawai Bohdanowicz, 1979 – Nepal
Synagelides oleksiaki Bohdanowicz, 1987 – Nepal
Synagelides orlandoi Kanesharatnam & Benjamin, 2020 – Sri Lanka
Synagelides palpalis Zabka, 1985 – China, Vietnam
Synagelides palpaloides Peng, Tso & Li, 2002 – Taiwan
Synagelides platnicki Lin & Li, 2020 – China
Synagelides proszynskii Barrion, Barrion-Dupo & Heong, 2013 – China
Synagelides rosalindae Kanesharatnam & Benjamin, 2020 – China
Synagelides serratus Liu, 2022 – China
Synagelides shuqiang Liu, 2022 – China
Synagelides subagoriformis Li, Wang & Peng, 2021 – China
Synagelides subgambosus Wang, Mi, Irfan & Peng, 2020 – China
Synagelides sumatranus Logunov & Hereward, 2006 – Indonesia (Sumatra)
Synagelides tangi Liu, Chen, Xu & Peng, 2017 – China
Synagelides tianmu Song, 1990 – China
Synagelides triangulatus Liu, 2022 – China
Synagelides triangulus Li, Wang & Peng, 2021 – China
Synagelides tukchensis Bohdanowicz, 1987 – Nepal
Synagelides ullerensis Bohdanowicz, 1987 – Nepal
Synagelides walesai Bohdanowicz, 1987 – Nepal
Synagelides wangdicus Bohdanowicz, 1978 – Bhutan
Synagelides wuermlii Bohdanowicz, 1978 – Bhutan
Synagelides wuliangensis Wang, Mi, Irfan & Peng, 2020 – China
Synagelides xingdouensis Wang, Mi, Irfan & Peng, 2020 – China
Synagelides yinae Liu, Chen, Xu & Peng, 2017 – China
Synagelides yunnan Song & Zhu, 1998 – China
Synagelides zebrus Peng & Li, 2008 – China
Synagelides zhaoi Peng, Li & Chen, 2003 – China
Synagelides zhilcovae Prószyński, 1979 – Russia (Far East), Korea, Japan, China, Taiwan
Synagelides zonatus Peng & Li, 2008 – China

References

Salticidae
Salticidae genera
Spiders of Asia
Taxa named by Embrik Strand